The 82901 / 82902 Ahmedabad–Mumbai Central Tejas Express is a train on the Ahmedabad–Mumbai route. It is a semi-high speed, fully air-conditioned train Introduced by Indian Railways connecting Ahmedabad to Mumbai along with six stations named Nadiad, Vadodara, Bharuch, Surat, Vapi, and Borivali. This train started running from 19 January 2020. The fare of the train will be dynamic.

Since its inauguration, this train is India's second private train after Lucknow–New Delhi Tejas Express, both operated by IRCTC.

Coach Composition 
The 82901/82902 Ahmedabad Jn – Mumbai Central Tejas Express presently has 3 AC Executive Chair Car, 8 AC Chair Car coaches along with 2 End-on Generator coaches.

As with most train services in India, coach composition may be amended at the discretion of Indian Railways depending on demand.

Schedule 
 Tejas Express (82902) will depart from Ahmedabad at 06.40 am via Nadiad, Vadodara Bharuch, Surat, Vapi & Borivali to Mumbai Central railway station. The train will reach Mumbai at 1.10 pm.
 Tejas Express (82901) will depart from Mumbai to Ahmedabad Junction railway station at 3.40 pm and will reach Ahmedabad at 9.55 pm.

Facilities
For the first time entertainment facilities have been introduced in Indian Railways. The Ahmedabad–Mumbai Tejas is the first Indian train to have LCD screens for each individual passengers though this facility will be available only in Executive Chair Car. In the LCD passengers can enjoy Hindi, Marathi, Gujarati movies, listen music as well as Passenger Information System is also available. Moreover, passengers can enjoy on-board free WiFi facilities.

Stoppage

 
 
 
 
 Vapi

Traction
It is hauled by a Vadodara-based WAP-7 locomotive from end to end.

References 

Tejas Express trains
Railway services introduced in 2020
Privately operated trains